In Between is the third solo studio album by American hip hop artist Onry Ozzborn, a member of the Pacific Northwest hip hop collective Oldominion. It was released November 8, 2005 on Camobear Records, an independent Canadian hip hop record label run by Josh Martinez. Guest appearances include the likes of Aceyalone, Busdriver and Ill Bill.

Music 
The album is produced by Mr. Hill, Smoke M2D6, Pale Soul and Wisper. It also features Aceyalone, Blac, Busdriver, Ill Bill, and Oldominion members Anaxagorus, Mako, Pale Soul, Sirens Echo, Sleep, Smoke M2D6, Snafu, Toni Hill, and Yadira Brown. Scratches are by DJ Wicked and DJ Scene.

Track listing

References

External links 
 In Between at Bandcamp
 In Between at Discogs

Onry Ozzborn albums
Pacific Northwest hip hop albums
2005 albums